Albert Riera Ortega (born 15 April 1982) is a Spanish former footballer who played as left winger but also as a left-back, currently manager of Slovenian club Olimpija Ljubljana.

He made a name for himself at Espanyol (with whom he won a Copa del Rey and reached the 2007 UEFA Cup Final) and also played professionally in France, England, Greece, Turkey, Italy and Slovenia, notably spending three years with Galatasaray.

Riera won 16 caps for Spain, representing the nation at the 2009 Confederations Cup.

Club career

Mallorca
Born in Manacor, Balearic Islands, Riera started his professional career with hometown club Mallorca. He could only total 11 La Liga appearances in his first two seasons.

In the 2002–03 campaign, already an undisputed starter, Riera helped the local team to the conquest of the Copa del Rey, and scored four league goals in 35 games.

Bordeaux
In the summer of 2003, Riera moved to Bordeaux. He made 66 competitive appearances for the Ligue 1 side over a two-year spell, netting nine times.

Espanyol
Riera returned to Spain in 2005, when he signed for Espanyol. In his first season he played only eight league matches, prompting a January 2006 loan move to Manchester City where he was also unable to establish himself, scoring his only goal against Newcastle United in a 3–0 home win on 1 February.

Riera returned to Catalonia prior to 2006–07. During that season, Espanyol reached the final of the UEFA Cup at Hampden Park, Glasgow, where they played fellow Spaniards Sevilla; he scored to level the game at 1–1, but his team eventually lost 3–1 on penalties. At the end of the campaign, he extended his contract until 2011.

Liverpool

On 1 September 2008 (transfer deadline day), Riera signed a four-year deal with Liverpool for a fee of £8 million, being given the number 11 shirt. He made his Premier League debut on the 13th, playing 71 minutes of a 2–1 home win against Manchester United, and scored his first goal for the Reds as they beat Wigan Athletic 3–2 on 18 October, adding another in the 3–1 victory at PSV Eindhoven in the group stage of the UEFA Champions League.

Riera netted Liverpool's first goal of 2009, and also scored in the third round in the FA Cup on 3 January, against Preston North End. Later during that season he scored against Aston Villa in a 5–0 home rout on 22 March 2009, through a half-volley after Pepe Reina's long goal kick.

On 18 March 2010, Riera was suspended after comments made to the Spanish press regarding his first team opportunities and the approach of manager Rafael Benítez. The player was quoted as saying: "He's never sorted out a situation with a player by talking with him." He was transfer listed following the comments, with Russian clubs CSKA Moscow and Spartak Moscow thought to be interested in a permanent move. On the 23rd of that month it was announced that Liverpool had accepted a £6 million bid from CSKA for the player; however, it appeared to be solely rumours, any interest was officially denied– additionally, the player's agent, Ángel Castells, confirmed that only Spartak had made a proposal.

Olympiacos
On 23 July 2010, Riera joined Olympiacos on a four-year contract. The deal was reported to be worth around €6 million (€4 million plus another potential €2 million in bonuses), with a salary of around €2.5 million per season; he became one of the most expensive transfers in the country's history, as he reunited with former Espanyol manager Ernesto Valverde.

Riera scored his first goal against Kerkyra in a 2–0 home win, and appeared in 28 competitive matches during the season as the Piraeus team won the Super League Greece.

Galatasaray

On 3 September 2011, Riera completed a €3 million move to Turkish side Galatasaray, signing a four-year deal. He scored his first goal in the Süper Lig on 25 January 2012 in a 4–0 home defeat of Ankaragücü, and was an habitual first-choice in his first season as the Istanbul-based team won the national championship; he was also involved, however, in a punching session with teammate Felipe Melo just before the playoffs started.

Following the arrival of prospect Nordin Amrabat for the 2012–13 campaign, Riera was reconverted by manager Fatih Terim into an attacking left-back, mainly due to the lack of options in the position other than injury-prone Hakan Balta. On 28 January 2014, he agreed to have his contract terminated for €750,000 and left the Ali Sami Yen Stadium.

Watford
On 24 March 2014, Riera signed a pre-contract with Italian side Udinese, effective as of 1 July. Three days later, he joined Football League Championship's Watford until the end of the season.

Riera scored his first and only goal for Watford on 19 April 2014, in the 3–1 home win over Ipswich Town. He had an extended run until late in the month, when he was sent off for two bookable offences in a 3–1 loss at Charlton Athletic after a high challenge on Diego Poyet. After the match, he was charged by The Football Association for improper conduct, having confronted the officials and having to be dragged away by his team-mates; he was given a two-match ban although only one remained to end the campaign, and he subsequently returned to Udinese.

Later career
On 29 November 2014, Riera was sacked by Udinese for attending a poker tournament rather than reporting to play against Chievo, also taking to Twitter to insult the organisation. He returned to his first club Mallorca the following 5 March, after agreeing to a one-and-a-half year deal. In May, he was subjected to disciplinary proceedings after claiming he would not appear again for the team as long as Miquel Soler was the manager.

On 11 September 2015, Slovenian sports newspaper Ekipa reported that Riera would sign a contract with Zavrč. Three days later, he was officially presented.

Riera terminated his contract on 22 January 2016, but remained in the country as he joined Koper until June 2018 shortly after. He joined the team also as an assistant sporting director, and made one brief appearance against Primorje in the first game of the second half of the season; he was then suspended from training and his contract was cancelled unilaterally in July 2016.

Coaching
Riera officially announced his retirement from football on 24 January 2018, through a social media post portraying himself having literally hung up his boots on a tree. He obtained a UEFA Pro Licence in 2019, and in August of the following year he returned to Galatasaray to be an assistant coach to Fatih Terim. In January 2022, he went back to the Nef Stadium to work alongside compatriot Domènec Torrent.

On 4 July 2022, Riera returned to the Slovenian top tier when he was appointed manager of Olimpija Ljubljana. He was forced out of his first press conference by Olimpija ultras, Green Dragons, unhappy with the dismissal of predecessor Robert Prosinečki. He made his debut three days later at home to Differdange in the first qualifying round of the UEFA Europa Conference League, drawing 1–1, and requiring extra time in the second leg to advance through the tie. His team began the league season on 14 July with a 2–0 home win over Mura, followed by a further seven league victories to make it eight consecutive wins, which was the club's best start to a season since 1994.

International career
Riera made his debut for the Spain national team on 13 October 2007 in an UEFA Euro 2008 qualifier against Denmark, and scored from outside the box in a 3–1 away win. However, he failed to make the final cut for the final stages, where the nation won the tournament.

Riera was again called to the squad in October 2008 for two 2010 FIFA World Cup qualifiers after Sevilla's Diego Capel withdrew with an injury, and played 12 minutes in a 3–0 victory in Estonia. In the following year, on 1 April, he netted a last-minute winner in Turkey (2–1).

Manager Vicente del Bosque named Riera in the squad for the 2009 FIFA Confederations Cup, and he made four appearances for the third-placed team.

Personal life
Riera's younger brother, Sito, is also a footballer. He too represented Espanyol, but only their reserves.

In 2009, Riera married Julia Koroleva, fathering three children with his Russian bride. He moved to Tomsk in Siberia, where he set up a football academy.

Career statistics

Club
Sources:

International

Scores and results list Spain's goal tally first, score column indicates score after each Riera goal.

Managerial statistics

Honours
Mallorca
Copa del Rey: 2002–03

Espanyol
UEFA Cup runner-up: 2006–07

Olympiacos
Super League Greece: 2010–11

Galatasaray
Süper Lig: 2011–12, 2012–13
Turkish Super Cup: 2012

Spain
FIFA Confederations Cup third place: 2009

References

External links

Liverpool historic profile

1982 births
Living people
Spanish emigrants to Russia
Sportspeople from Manacor
Spanish footballers
Footballers from Mallorca
Association football wingers
Association football utility players
La Liga players
Segunda División players
Segunda División B players
RCD Mallorca B players
RCD Mallorca players
RCD Espanyol footballers
Ligue 1 players
FC Girondins de Bordeaux players
Premier League players
English Football League players
Manchester City F.C. players
Liverpool F.C. players
Watford F.C. players
Super League Greece players
Olympiacos F.C. players
Süper Lig players
Galatasaray S.K. footballers
Udinese Calcio players
Slovenian PrvaLiga players
NK Zavrč players
FC Koper players
Spain youth international footballers
Spain under-21 international footballers
Spain international footballers
2009 FIFA Confederations Cup players
Spanish expatriate footballers
Expatriate footballers in France
Expatriate footballers in England
Expatriate footballers in Greece
Expatriate footballers in Turkey
Expatriate footballers in Italy
Expatriate footballers in Slovenia
Spanish expatriate sportspeople in France
Spanish expatriate sportspeople in England
Spanish expatriate sportspeople in Greece
Spanish expatriate sportspeople in Turkey
Spanish expatriate sportspeople in Italy
Spanish expatriate sportspeople in Slovenia
Spanish football managers
NK Olimpija Ljubljana (2005) managers
Spanish expatriate football managers
Expatriate football managers in Slovenia
Galatasaray S.K. (football) non-playing staff